Christopher Jon Weinke (born July 31, 1972) is an American football coach, former professional football player, and former professional baseball player.  After spending six years in the Toronto Blue Jays minor league baseball system, he enrolled at Florida State University at the age of 25, and played quarterback for the Florida State Seminoles. He thereafter played professionally in the NFL, where he spent most of his career with the Carolina Panthers.

Weinke played minor league baseball in the Toronto Blue Jays farm system from 1990 to 1996, advancing to class Triple-A, before deciding to attend Florida State University. Head coach Bobby Bowden had initially recruited Weinke when he was a prep quarterback in 1989 at Cretin-Derham Hall High School. After quitting baseball, Weinke called Bowden, and Bowden offered him a scholarship with the 1997 recruiting class. After arriving he quickly distinguished himself as a starting quarterback, leading the team to victory in the 1999 National Championship. In 2000, at 28, he became the oldest person to receive the Heisman Trophy. He was drafted by the Carolina Panthers in the 2001 NFL Draft, where he served mostly as backup quarterback until being released in 2006. He then spent one season with the San Francisco 49ers before leaving the NFL after the 2007 season.

Weinke only had two wins in his entire NFL career, winning the first game of the 2001 Carolina Panthers season and then losing the rest. He also has the second longest losing streak in NFL at seventeen behind Dan Pastorini (21). Despite this, Weinke is tied with Geno Smith for fifth most rushing touchdowns by a rookie quarterback (six), behind Vince Young (seven), Robert Griffin III (seven), Josh Allen (eight) and Cam Newton (fourteen).

Early life

Weinke was born and raised in St. Paul, Minnesota, where he attended Cretin-Derham Hall High School and was a three-sport star, playing first base for the baseball team, quarterback for the football team, and was captain of the hockey team. In 1989 during his senior year in high school, he was a Parade magazine and USA Today first-team All-America selection, was named Minnesota's prep football player of the year, and was seen as the top senior quarterback in the country. Weinke was recruited by over seventy Division 1 schools, including Alabama, Arizona, Arizona State, Florida State, Illinois, Minnesota, Miami, Washington, and Wisconsin, but ultimately signed a national letter of intent and committed to play quarterback for the Florida State Seminoles of Florida State University despite being a diehard Miami Hurricanes fan (due to fellow Cretin-Derham Hall alumnus Steve Walsh attending the school and starring for the team at quarterback).  However, he was also an all-state baseball player and was drafted in the second round of the 1990 Major League Baseball First-Year Player draft (the 62nd player taken overall) by the Toronto Blue Jays.  After spending four days in August 1990 on the FSU campus, Weinke put his college career on hold and instead signed a contract to play professional baseball and reported to the Toronto Blue Jays' Class A affiliate Myrtle Beach Blue Jays. Head football coach Bobby Bowden promised Weinke that he would always have a scholarship offer if he wished to return.

College football career
Although he was only one step away from playing in the major leagues, after the 1996 season Weinke decided to give up professional baseball and took a scholarship at Florida State University.

Weinke entered Florida State University in 1997, when he was 25 years old and joined the Florida State Seminoles football team as a quarterback. As a sophomore in 1998, Weinke led the Florida State Seminoles to a 9–1 record and #2 national ranking before a season-ending neck injury by Patrick Kerney in the Virginia game forced him to the sidelines for the rest of the season. During his junior season in 1999, he led the #1-ranked Seminoles to the school's first undefeated national championship, defeating Michael Vick and the Virginia Tech Hokies, 46–29. As a senior in 2000, Weinke led the nation in passing with 4,167 yards and won the Heisman Trophy, awarded to college football's best player, as well as the Davey O'Brien Award and the Johnny Unitas Award. He also led the Seminoles to the Orange Bowl for their third national championship game in as many years, where they lost 13–2 to the Oklahoma Sooners. At the age of 28, Weinke was the oldest player ever to win the Heisman Trophy. He finished his Florida State career with a 32–3 record and held numerous FSU records including most passing yards in a career and most career touchdown passes. In 2001, Weinke became the seventh Seminole (and second quarterback) to have his jersey retired. He also graduated with a degree in Sports Management and was a two-time ACC All-Academic Team selection.

Weinke was originally recruited by Florida State as part of the same recruiting class as Charlie Ward, another quarterback who also won a Heisman Trophy and led the Seminoles to a national championship.  They both were members of the 1990 Florida State football team, but Weinke left to pursue baseball before the 1990 season started.

Weinke was the first Heisman Trophy winner to not be named a consensus All-American. The consensus All-American honor for quarterback in 2000 went to the Heisman runner-up that year, Oklahoma’s Josh Heupel, now the head football coach at the University of Tennessee.

Professional football career

Carolina Panthers
Weinke was selected by the Carolina Panthers in the fourth round (106th overall pick) of the 2001 NFL Draft. In 2001, he was the starter when the Panthers finished with a 1–15 record. At the time, the Panthers' fifteen consecutive losses in 2001 was a single season record. Weinke averaged 36 pass attempts per game, more than any rookie in NFL history up to that point. After the season, Weinke became the Panthers backup quarterback. He saw his first action since the 2002 season on October 16, 2005, when starter Jake Delhomme went down with an injury against the Detroit Lions. Weinke threw a touchdown pass to wide receiver Ricky Proehl, giving the Panthers the 21–20 win over the Lions.

He re-signed with Carolina during the 2006 off-season, where he continued to back up Delhomme. On December 10, 2006, in a game against the New York Giants, Weinke made his first start since 2001. The Panthers lost the game, but Weinke threw for 423 yards, topping the previous single-game team record of 373 set by Steve Beuerlein. Weinke started the next two games against the Pittsburgh Steelers and Atlanta Falcons, with the game against Atlanta being his second (and last) win as a starter in the NFL. As a starting QB for the Panthers, Weinke's team lost seventeen consecutive games that he started (fourteen in 2001, one in 2002 and two in 2006).

Franchise records
 Pass completions, regular season game (36, 2001-12-30 ARI; with Teddy Bridgewater)
 Pass attempts, regular season game (63, 2001-12-30 ARI), rookie season (540)
 Interceptions, rookie season (nineteen; with Kerry Collins), rookie game (four, 2001-10-21 @WAS; with Kerry Collins x2 and Cam Newton)
 Times sacked, rookie game (eight, 2001-12-02 @NOR)

San Francisco 49ers
The San Francisco 49ers signed Weinke on December 12, 2007, after injuries to quarterbacks Alex Smith, Trent Dilfer and Shaun Hill. He started the final game of the 2007 season in a 20–7 loss to the Cleveland Browns. Weinke was not brought back by the 49ers for the 2008 season.

Later life
After retirement, Weinke and his family lived in Austin, Texas, where he worked as a vice-president in marketing and event-planning for Triton Financial. In 2010, Weinke teamed with Pro Football Hall of Fame coach John Madden and became the director of the IMG Madden Football Academy in Bradenton, Florida. The Academy offers a comprehensive football training program that emphasizes teaching the fundamental techniques of the game. In 2011, Weinke worked with the Carolina Panthers' number one draft pick Cam Newton at IMG up to two hours a day during the NFL lockout.

Coaching career
On February 19, 2015, it was announced that Weinke had been hired as quarterbacks coach of the St. Louis Rams. On January 18, 2017, it was announced by the LA Times that Weinke would be replaced by Greg Olson, effectively terminating his employment with the Rams.

On March 1, 2017, it was announced Weinke would be joining the University of Alabama coaching staff as an offensive analyst.

On February 21, 2018, it was announced Weinke would join the University of Tennessee coaching staff as running backs coach. In 2019, it was announced Weinke would move from running backs coach to coaching quarterbacks at Tennessee until Jan 2021.

On January 2, 2022, Weinke was announced as the quarterbacks coach for Georgia Tech.

References

External links
 
 
 

1972 births
Living people
American football quarterbacks
Alabama Crimson Tide football coaches
Carolina Panthers players
Dunedin Blue Jays players
Florida State Seminoles football players
Heisman Trophy winners
Knoxville Smokies players
Los Angeles Rams coaches
Myrtle Beach Hurricanes players
Players of American football from Saint Paul, Minnesota
St. Catharines Blue Jays players
St. Louis Rams coaches
San Francisco 49ers players
Sportspeople from Saint Paul, Minnesota
Syracuse Chiefs players
American expatriate baseball players in Canada